Michalis Katsaros (Greek: Μιχάλης Κατσαρός) was a Greek poet. He was born in 1919 in Kiparissia (Greek: Κυπαρισσία) and died in 1998 in Athens. His main occupation was to write poems and painting. He was a poet with intense politicization.

The War
During The occupation of Greece 1941-1944 (Greek: Η Κατοχή, I Katochi, meaning "The Occupation") he joined the resistance. Michalis Katsaros after the war passed through a painful silence, as all the poetries in his generation, in the way he spent himself in successive collections.

Early life 
He was married with the painter Koula Maragopoulou. In 1945 he moved to Athens and lived for many years in difficult conditions, exerting various livelihood occupations like cashier at a merchant, journalist illegal press and the radio officer. He collaborated with the magazines "Foundation" (1947), "Poetic Art", "The New Greek", "Athenian Letters" and "Target" (1950) and in 1975 published the magazine "System", where he published mainly own work.

Works

Poetry 
 My shape ("Τὸ σχῆμα μου")
 My covenant ("Ἡ διαθήκη μου")
 Resist ("Ἀντισταθεῖτε") 
 What you see ("Αὐτοὺς ποὺ βλέπεις")
 The sea ("Ἡ Θαλασσινή")
 We will wait ("Θὰ σᾶς περιμένω")
 Against Sadducees ("Κατὰ Σαδδουκαίων" 1953 )
 Less eggs ("Μεῖον ὠά")
 Do not leave ("Μὴ φύγεις")
 Servant ("Ὁ Δοῦλος")
 Lakis ("Ὁ Λάκης")
 Father with harmonica ("Ὁ πατέρας μὲ τὴ φυσαρμόνικα")
 Home ("Σπίτι")
 In stones ("Στὰ λιθάρια")
 On your Earth ("Στὴ γῆ σου")
 Your image ("Τὴν εἰκόνα σου")
 The lamb ("Τὸ ἀρνί")
 Plateau ("Οροπέδιο" 1956)
 Mesologgi ("Μεσολογγι" 1949)
 Writing ("Σύγγραμμα" 1975) 
 Modern brochure ("Σύγχρονες Μπροσούρες" 1977)
 Garments ("Εδύματα" 1977)

Music 

His work was turned into music by the famous Greek composer Mikis Theodorakis , A.Kounadis and G. Markopoulos   
3rd edition 

The composer Hans Werner Henze set two of Katsaros' poems for his song-cycle Voices (1973).

Books 
Michalis Katsaros was the inspiration for one of her nephew imaginary character on her book "A Letter From Greece".

References 

20th-century Greek poets
1919 births
1998 deaths
Greek male poets
20th-century Greek male writers